The Main Department of Internal Affairs of Kazan or just Kazan Police, is the largest municipal police force in Tatarstan with primary responsibilities in law enforcement and investigation within the Kazan City. The Police is the third largest police department established in Russia (after Moscow Police and Saint Petersburg Police). It has its headquarters in Karl Marx 21 Street, in central Kazan.

The Main Department of Internal Affairs is the Kazan's executive agency, part of the system of Internal Affairs of Russian Ministry of Internal Affairs, the police public safety is also subordinate to the Kazan Municipality. The main responsibilities are the internal security, human rights and freedoms, suppression and detection of crime, and protection of public order.

The Police department headed by the chief, who appoints and removes from office on Ministerial decree by the Ministry of Internal Affairs on the recommendation of the Mayor of Kazan. Before he suggest a nomination, the Internal Minister turns the view of Kazan Mayor. The Control over the activities of the police are carried out by the Ministry of Internal Affairs of the Russian Federation, the Mayor, the Municipality of Kazan and the Kazan City Duma.

The Municipal police force was established in 1977. Before that date the duties of law enforcement in Kazan was under the direct responsibility of The Ministry of Internal Affairs. Currently police chief is Valery Krasilnikov (Since 2010).

History
The Kazan municipal police established in 1977, as part of the executive council of Kazan city, while the MVDis remain as supportive body. The police was re-organised multiple times.

On 1991 several department were formed, as Economic Crimes Department and the Departmend against Organised Crime. In the recent years the police has been criticized for brutality levels. Fellowing the death of detained man, the police chief has been replaced; Valery Krasilnikov has been appointed instead Alexey Selivanovskiy as the Head of Kazan's Police.

In July 2013 the police took part along with FSB in the security arrangements for the 2013 Summer Universiade, the biggest sport event in Russia since the 1980 Summer Olympics.

Chief of Kazan Police
Zagfar Khaliullin (1977–1981)
Marcel Ainutdinov (1981–1985)
Dilus Minnullin (1985–1988)
Iskander Galimov (1988–1993)
Nurgayan Akbarov (1993–1998)
Evgeny Davletshin (1998–2003)
Fayaz Shabayev (2003–2006)
Alexey Selivanovskiy (2006–2010)
Valery Krasilnikov (2010-2016)
Alexey Sokolov (2016-2019)
Alexander Mishikhin (since 2019)

Structure

Territorial Divisions
Kazan Metro Police Department
 K-9 Center
Police Patrol Regiment
Traffic Police Regiment
Team special of the Patrol Police (for mass events) of the Kazan Police Department
Special police unit GROM 
Aviastroitel District 
Aviastroitelniy Police Station 1th
Vakhtovskiy District
Yapeeva police Station 16th
Kirov District
Near-River Police Station 3rd
Yudino Police Station 4th
Moscow District
Moscow Police Station 5th
Voskhod Police Station 11th
New Savin District
Savinovo Police Station 6th
Ggarin Police Station 7th
Yamashev Police Station 17th
Near-Volga District
Gorky Police Station 8th
Safiullina Police Station 9th
Tankodrom Police Station 15th
Industrial Police Station 10th
Soviet District
Guard Police Station 12th
Azino-2 Police Station 13th
Derbyshky Police Station 14th

See also
Police of Russia
Saint Petersburg Police
Moscow Police

References

External links
Official website (In Russian)

Organizations established in 1772
Law enforcement agencies of Russia
Kazan